ORPHEUS is the acronym for Organisation for PhD Education in Biomedicine and Health Sciences in the European System.

ORPHEUS is committed to safeguard the PhD as a research degree and to strengthen career opportunities for PhD graduates.

History
ORPHEUS was established in April 2004 with a European Conference on Harmonisation of PhD Programmes in Biomedicine and Health Sciences held in Zagreb. It became clear that despite many similarities PhD programmes there are also important differences in content and the standard expected. Thus a PhD title (also known as Doctor of Philosophy) may have different meanings in different parts of Europe. While some countries did not have any clinical PhD programmes, others had even two. Thus, the delegates coming from 25 universities and from 16 European countries agreed that there was a need for European harmonisation and they accepted 'The Declaration of the European Conference on Harmonisation of PhD Programmes in Medicine and Health Sciences' known as the  'Zagreb Declaration', which contain the first European consensus statement what a PhD programme should consist of and aim for. Many of the ideas of the 'Zagreb Declaration' are also seen in the Salzburg Principles and subsequent Salzburg II recommendations from the EUA-CDE.

Since 2004, ORPHEUS conferences have been held annually at different countries within Europe (see below), with normal attendances of 150-200 participants.

Aims
ORPHEUS has the following aims:
 To give active support and guidance to members of ORPHEUS in enhancing their contributions to medicine and society in general.
 To provide information to members of ORPHEUS and all PhD candidates all over Europe.
 To represent higher education and research in biomedicine and health sciences and to influence policy making at national, European and international level
 To encourage cooperation among members of the Association and the development of effective bilateral and multilateral networks.
 To promote cooperation in research and development of joint PhD programmes.
 To promote harmonisation of PhD programmes in biomedicine and health sciences
 To encourage mobility of PhD candidates and academic staff.
 To stimulate quality assurance of PhD research and education, and in particular to develop an accreditation process of PhD programmes in biomedicine and health sciences
 To cooperate with other associations with similar goals

ORPHEUS Self-evaluation and Labelling
The primary ORPHEUS tool is its Best Practices which in a concise manner provides recommendations for the aims and content of PhD programmes in biomedicine and health sciences. The document is the result of extensive consultation throughout Europe with stakeholders including deans, graduate school heads, supervisors and students. The document has been found to be appropriate for institutions throughout Europe.

Implementation of the Best Practices is encouraged through the ORPHEUS Labelling programme that allows institutions to self-evaluate and obtain an ORPHEUS Label. Through a simple questionnaire, institutions can determine the extent to which their PhD programmes are consistent with the ORPHEUS recommendations as shown in the Best Practices document. Institutions which believe they comply with these recommendations can apply for a Label. In this case an evaluation team is set up by the Labelling Board to assess if this case usually in connection with a site-visit. Institutions who do not qualify for a Label may be awarded an Evaluation Certificate.

Key ORPHEUS documents
 Best Practices for PhD Training
 Standards for PhD education in Biomedicine and Health Sciences in Europe. 2012 
 Towards Standards for PhD Education in Biomedicine and Health Sciences. A position paper from ORPHEUS. 2009
 Helsinki Consensus Statement on PhD Training in Clinical Research. 2007
 'Zagreb Declaration. 2004'

ORPHEUS conferences
 ORPHEUS 2020 conference delayed to 2021 due to Covid-19 pandemic.
 ORPHEUS 2019, 14th European Conference Dublin, 2019
 ORPHEUS 2018, 13th European Conference Reykjavik, 2018 
 ORPHEUS 2017, 12th European Conference Klaipeda, 2017
 ORPHEUS 2016, 11th European Conference Cologne, 2016
 ORPHEUS 2015, 10th European Conference Belgrade, 2015
 ORPHEUS 2014, Ninth European Conference Lausanne, 2014
 ORPHEUS 2013, Eighth European Conference Prague, 2013
 ORPHEUS 2012. Seventh European Conference. Establishing Evaluation of PhD Training. Bergen 2012.
 ORPHEUS 2011. Sixth European Conference. PhD Quality Indicators for Biomedicine and Health Sciences. Izmir 2011.
 ORPHEUS 2010. Fifth European Conference: The Advancement of European Biomedical and Health Science PhD Education by Cooperative Networking. Vienna 2010.
 ORPHEUS2009. Fourth European Conference: Setting Standards for PhD Education in Biomedicine and Health Sciences. Aarhus 2009. 
 ORPHEUS2007. Third European Conference: Biomedical and Health Science Doctoral Training. Helsinki 2007.
 Second European Conference on Harmonisation of PhD Programmes in Biomedicine and Health Sciences. Zagreb 2005.
 First European Conference on Harmonization of PhD programs in Biomedicine and Health Sciences. Zagreb 2004.

External links

 Official website

Higher education
Medical education